Suprakash Chaki is a Bengali singer, who also sings modern songs, including ‘Eshona nutan jagot gori’, ‘Alo-aandharer shathei’, ‘Tomar o chokhhe’ and ‘Akash jakhon natun ronge shaaje’. Suprakash is noted for 'raga sangeet' and ‘Tomari binar’ replete with the shooting touch of the raga Desi. His sober approach and melodious voice has won the appreciation of listeners all over India, ranging from the romantic ‘Bhalobasha biliye dite’ by Khitish Santra, to the simplicity of ‘Manikmoti’ by Panchanan Das. Suprakash has also tuned the puja-songs of Leena Ghatok and Babul Saha. He has also been the affiliated composer and lyricist of Television and Akashbani and trainer of Jadavpur University and Banichakra.

Early life
Birth Place : Dinajpur (Bangladesh)

Father's Name : Ahibhushan Chaki

Mother's Name : Jyotsnarani Chaki

Wife's Name : Shrimati Shamita Chaki (Vocalist)

School Education : Modern School

Higher Education : City College (Armhest Street)

Sanskrit Education (Tol) : Chandrakrishore Chatushpathi
Teacher : Late Durgaprashanna Bidyabhusan

Music Education : Sangeetnatak Academy, Geetabetan

Sangeet Guru : Late Jyotibhusan Chaki, Late Jyotirindra Maitra, Late Tansen Pande (Dhrupad), Late Tarapada Chakraborty (Kheyal), Late Rameshchandra Bandopadhay, Shri Amiyaranjan Bandopadhay, Late Chitta Ray, Late Aparesh Lahiri, Late Kamala Basu

The artiste is an affiliated singer, composer and lyricist of A.I.R and Television.
Artiste Suprakash Chaki was inspired by popular actor Late Uttam Kumar, Late Jyotibhusan Chaki, Natyakar Late Shambhu Mitra, Journalist Shandhya Sen, Swaraj Sengupta.

Awards
 Artist Suprakash had won Narayan Gangopadhay Smriti Purashkar
 He also won the Shanskar Bharati(W.B) shambardhana
 Suprakash Chaki was awarded with the Pabna Gopal Chandra Institution Purashkar for his achievements in Music Junior Chamber

Music records
 Nana shadher gaan
 Edin amar chirodin
 Aadhunik
 Gulzar-i-ghazal
 Agamanir aanginay
 Shri shri ramakrishna
 Amar shapno bhora din
 Chhoray gaaney
 Deb debi bandana
 Ramakrishna sharada bandana
 Kaali naam-er shagore
 Shonaar aloy
 Debi bandana
 Rabindra sangeet

References

External links
 Website of shri Suprakash Chaki
 Rhythm & melody divine
 Biography
 http://epaper.thestatesman.com/c/32336572

Bengali singers
Indian male singer-songwriters
Indian singer-songwriters
Living people
City College, Kolkata alumni
University of Calcutta alumni
Singers from Kolkata
Year of birth missing (living people)